Amitostigma is a formerly recognized genus in the orchid family (Orchidaceae), now subsumed within Ponerorchis. It was an exclusively Asian genus of 28 orchids, growing in the alpine habitats of China, Taiwan, Japan, Korea, Vietnam, Thailand and the Kuril Islands. Twenty two species formerly placed in this genus grow in China.

References 

Historically recognized angiosperm taxa